Clifton Albert Frederick "Ziggy" Sprague (January 8, 1896 – April 11, 1955) was a World War II–era officer in the United States Navy.

Biography
Sprague was born in Dorchester, Massachusetts, and attended the Roxbury Latin School. He entered the United States Naval Academy in 1914.  There he was given the nickname "Ziggy".  Due to the American involvement in World War I he graduated and received his commission as an ensign one year early, on June 28, 1917, finishing forty-third out of 199.   His wife was the sister of The Great Gatsby author F. Scott Fitzgerald. 

Admiral Clifton "Ziggy" Sprague was no relation to his Naval Academy classmate Admiral Thomas L. "Tommy" Sprague.  Both Admirals Sprague were commanders in the Battle of Leyte Gulf.

World War I
His first assignment was on the gunboat , where he served as gunnery officer, communications officer, navigator, and executive officer.  Wheeling served as a convoy escort in the Atlantic and Mediterranean during the war.  While assigned to Wheeling he was promoted to lieutenant (junior grade) and lieutenant.  After the war in October 1919, Sprague was assigned as the reserve commanding officer of the destroyer  for two months.  Thereafter he was assigned to the new battleship  and served as 6th broadside battery officer for one year.

1920 to 1940 – Naval Aviator
On December 3, 1920, Sprague joined 33 other classmates at Naval Air Station Pensacola, Florida as a student pilot.  His first flight was on January 11, 1921, when he piloted a Curtiss N-9 aircraft for twenty minutes.  Sprague earned the designation Naval Aviator No. 2934 on August 11, 1921.  Due to his great proficiency, within two months he was designated as commanding officer of Aircraft Squadron 3 at Pensacola.

From March 1922 to November 1923, Sprague was assigned to Aircraft Squadron VS-1 with the Atlantic Fleet based on the seaplane tender . He reported to his next duty station Naval Air Station Anacostia, near Washington, D.C., in November 1923, where he served as a test pilot, operations officer, and executive officer. As a test pilot he conducted experimental and research work at the Naval Aircraft Factory in Philadelphia, Pennsylvania, in 1923, where he contributed to the development of aircraft carrier catapult systems.

Sprague reported to Lexington in March 1928, where he assumed the duties of flight deck officer and assistant air officer. Sprague's tour on Lexington ended in April 1929. Returning to the U.S. Naval Academy in May 1929, Sprague served as executive officer of VN-8-D5. On June 10, 1930, he was promoted to lieutenant commander. His tour at the Naval Academy ended in November 1931.

Sprague served as squadron commander of VP-8 in Panama in December 1931 to April 1934. The squadron was based on the seaplane tender  homeported at the Norfolk Navy Yard. In 1933 the squadron was moved to Hawaii, where Sprague became the first navy pilot to fly a thirteen-hour round-trip from Hawaii to Midway Island in February 1934. From May 1934 to July 1936, Sprague served as air operations officer at Naval Air Station Norfolk, Virginia, where his department serviced several aircraft carrier squadrons.

In July 1936, Sprague was assigned to the newly constructed aircraft carrier  as air officer.  After her commissioning, he piloted the first two landings ever made on Yorktown.  In addition, he was the first pilot to test the catapult system on Yorktown.  Sprague was promoted to commander in December 1937.  He spent all of 1938 managing the Air Department and aircraft squadrons on Yorktown.  In February 1939 Yorktown participated in Fleet Problem XX in the Caribbean.  Shortly thereafter, Sprague left the carrier in June 1939.  Sprague was ordered to the Naval War College in Newport, Rhode Island, in June 1939, where he spent three months in study before reporting to his first sea command, the 21-year-old oil tanker  at Puget Sound Naval Shipyard, Bremerton, Washington.  Sprague commanded Patoka until June 1940, when he was sent back to the Naval War College for two more months of study.

World War II

At Oakland, California, Sprague took command of the cargo ship , which was being converted into a seaplane tender in July 1940. Tangier was commissioned on August 25, 1941 and shortly thereafter transited to Bremerton, Washington, to load torpedoes.  At her homeport in Pearl Harbor, Hawaii, Tangier was mated with Fleet Patrol Wing Two.  Tangier was berthed at F-10 on the northwest side of Ford Island on the morning of December 7, 1941.  She was one of the first ships in the harbor to open fire and engaged several Japanese aircraft throughout the morning.  Tangier was credited with downing three aircraft.  As a result of his leadership at Pearl Harbor, Sprague was promoted to captain on January 3, 1942.  In early 1942 Tangier saw service at New Caledonia.

Sprague was assigned as air officer of Gulf Sea Frontier, Miami, Florida, in June 1942.  His duties involved improving defenses, keeping the sea lanes open, and countering the German U-boats on the Southeast coast of the United States.  Upon achieving his goals he was transferred in March 1943.  In April 1943, Sprague was transferred to Naval Air Center, Seattle, Washington, where he served as commander of the base and nearby Naval Air Station Sand Point.  This duty ended abruptly when he was assigned as the commanding officer of the newly constructed fast fleet carrier  in October 1943.

Arriving at Bethlehem Steel's Fore River Yard near Boston, Massachusetts, Sprague took command of Wasp where she was commissioned on November 24, 1943.  The carrier was quickly sent to the Pacific, where she joined the war against the Japanese.  Her first combat missions were to destroy enemy aircraft, installations, and surface craft on Marcus and Wake Islands in May 1944.  In June 1944 Wasp participated in the invasion of Saipan and the Battle of the Philippine Sea.  On July 9, 1944, shortly before leaving Wasp, Sprague was promoted to rear admiral at age 48.

In September 1944 his task unit supported the Morotai landing.

Sprague's greatest achievement came on October 25, 1944 when his Task Unit 77.4.3 (radio call sign Taffy III) consisting of 6 escort carriers, 3 destroyers, and 4 destroyer escorts fought off the 4 battleships, 6 heavy cruisers, 2 light cruisers, and 11 destroyers of Japanese Admiral Takeo Kurita's vastly superior Center Force at the Battle off Samar near Samar Island in the Philippines.  Taken by surprise by Kurita's larger, faster ships, Sprague coolly maneuvered his force to take maximum advantage of the wind and weather while his pilots bombed and strafed the attacking ships, even making dry runs after their ammunition ran out.  He ordered his escorts to lay smoke to cover the carriers, then ordered them to counterattack with torpedoes, culminating in toe-to-toe gun duels between Taffy III's destroyers and destroyer escorts and Center Force's  battleships and cruisers. Taffy III was mauled by Center Force, with four ships sunk and most of the others damaged, but Sprague succeeded in turning  Kurita back, preventing him from reaching his intended target—the vulnerable invasion shipping off Leyte Island—and sinking three of Center Force's heavy cruisers.  Sprague was awarded the Navy Cross for the leadership he displayed off Samar.

The next month he moved his flag back to Fanshaw Bay for the invasion of Okinawa. His task group operated against the Japanese home islands of Kyūshū, Honshū, and Hokkaidō. Sprague received the notification of the end of hostilities while steaming 151 miles off the eastern coast of Honshū on August 15, 1945. Four days after the Japanese surrender, Sprague and Ticonderoga entered Tokyo Bay.

Post War – Operation Crossroads and final duties

Sprague returned to the West Coast onboard  in November 1945. He spent the next month in Washington, D.C. briefing Naval leaders at the White House. During the next six months he supported the naval aviation forces in the Operation Crossroads nuclear tests on Bikini Atoll in the Marshall Islands.

At Corpus Christi, Texas, Sprague was assigned as Chief of Naval Air Basic Training in August 1946. In January 1948 he was redesignated as Commander, Naval Air Advanced Training. His tour ended in April 1948. During this tour Kearsarge operated in the Mediterranean. On January 1, 1949 to February 1950, Sprague was Commander of Naval Air Bases, Eleventh and Twelfth Naval District at Naval Air Station Coronado in San Diego, California. Reassigned in March 1950, Sprague was moved to Alaska, where he served as commandant of Seventeenth Naval District and commander of Alaskan Sea Frontier on Kodiak Island. It was from here that he embarked on a Boeing B-29 Superfortress and became the first U.S. Navy admiral to fly over the North Pole, on November 12, 1950.

Retirement and death
On August 9, 1951, Sprague requested voluntary retirement from the Navy and was officially retired on November 1, 1951.  As was custom at the time, he was advanced to vice admiral at retirement in recognition of his Navy Cross.  He had spent 34 years, 4 months, and 4 days on active duty.  In March 1955, Sprague fell ill of a weak heart and was moved to the Naval Hospital, San Diego, California.  On April 11, 1955, 59-year-old Sprague died from a massive heart attack.  Two days later he was buried at Fort Rosecrans National Cemetery at Point Loma, San Diego, California.

Decorations

Here is the ribbon bar of Vice Admiral Clifton Sprague:

Namesake
The Oliver Hazard Perry-class guided-missile frigate  was named after Vice Admiral Sprague.  The unclassified citation for the Navy Cross was displayed in the wardroom until shortly before decommissioning.

Books

  
Thomas, Evan, (2007), Sea of Thunder:  Four Naval Commanders and the Last Sea War, New York:  Simon and Schuster,  .

See also

References

1896 births
1955 deaths
People from Dorchester, Massachusetts
United States Navy vice admirals
United States Naval Academy alumni
Boston Latin School alumni
United States Navy personnel of World War I
United States Navy World War II admirals
United States Naval Aviators
Recipients of the Navy Cross (United States)
Recipients of the Legion of Merit
Burials at Fort Rosecrans National Cemetery
Military personnel from Massachusetts